The 12923/12924 Dr. Ambedkar Nagar–Nagpur Superfast Express is a weekly superfast train of Indian Railways, which runs between Dr. Ambedkar Nagar railway station of Indore, the largest city and commercial hub of Central Indian state Madhya Pradesh and Nagpur, the third largest city of neighbouring state Maharashtra. The train was extended from Indore to Mhow from January 2020.

Coach composition

The train consists of 22 coaches :

 1 AC II Tier
 3 AC III Tier
 11 Sleeper class
 4 General Unreserved
 1 Pantry car
 2 End-on Generator

Service

12923/ Dr. Ambedkar Nagar–Nagpur Express has an average speed of 55 km/hr and covers 608 km in 11 hrs 30 mins.

The 12924/Nagpur–Dr. Ambedkar Nagar Express has an average speed of 57 km/hr and covers 608 km in 11 hrs 35 mins.

Route and halts

The important halts of the train are:

 
 
 
 
 
 
 
 
 
 
 
 Katol

Schedule

Traction

Both trains are hauled by a Vadodara Electric Loco Shed-based WAP-5 or WAP-4E electric locomotive.

See also

 Ahilyanagari Express

References

Express trains in India
Transport in Mhow
Transport in Nagpur
Railway services introduced in 2005
Rail transport in Madhya Pradesh
Rail transport in Maharashtra